Benhalima Rouane (born February 28, 1979 in Frenda, Tiaret Province) is an Algerian football player.

National team statistics

External links
 
 

1979 births
Living people
People from Frenda
Algerian footballers
Algeria international footballers
USM Blida players
CA Bordj Bou Arréridj players
USM El Harrach players
AS Khroub players
MO Constantine players
JSM Tiaret players
Association football forwards
21st-century Algerian people